Allen Henry Vigneron (born October 21, 1948) is an American prelate of the Roman Catholic Church. He is the current archbishop of the Archdiocese of Detroit in Michigan and Ecclesiastical Superior of the Cayman Islands, serving since 2009.   Vigneron previously served as bishop of the Diocese of Oakland in California from 2003 to 2009 and as an auxiliary bishop for the Archdiocese of Detroit from 1996 to 2003.

Biography

Early life
The eldest of six children, Allen Vigneron was born on October 21, 1948, in Mount Clemens, Michigan, to Elwin and Bernardine (née Kott) Vigneron. He is of French descent on his father's side and German descent on his mother's. He graduated from Sacred Heart Major Seminary in Detroit in 1970, receiving degrees in both Philosophy and Classical Languages. He then furthered his studies at the Pontifical Gregorian University in Rome, where he obtained a Bachelor of Sacred Theology degree in 1973.

Priesthood
Upon his return to Detroit, Vigneron was ordained to the priesthood by Cardinal John Dearden on July 26, 1975 at St. Clement of Rome Church in Romeo, Michigan. He then served as associate pastor of Our Lady Queen of Peace Parish in Harper Woods, Michigan.  He returned to  Rome, obtaining his Licentiate in Sacred Theology from the Gregorian University in 1977.  After returning to Michigan, he resumed his pastoral work in suburban Detroit.

Vigneron completed his graduate studies at the Catholic University of America in Washington, D.C., earning his Doctor of Philosophy degree in 1987 with a dissertation on the philosopher Edmund Husserl. In 1985, Vigneron was appointed professor at Sacred Heart Seminary, becoming dean in 1988.

From 1991 to 1994, Vigneron served in Rome as an official in the Vatican Secretariat of State and as adjunct instructor at the Gregorian University. He then returned to Sacred Heart Seminary as its rector. While at Sacred Heart, Vigneron removed several teachers that he perceived as straying from church dogma. Vigneron was raised by Pope John Paul II to the rank of monsignor in 1994.

Episcopate

Auxiliary Bishop of Detroit
On June 12, 1996, John Paul II appointed Vigneron as auxiliary bishop of the Archdiocese of Detroit and titular bishop of Sault Sainte Marie. He was consecrated on July 9, 1996 by Cardinal Adam Maida, with Cardinal James Hickey and Cardinal Edmund Szoka serving as co-consecrators.

Bishop of Oakland

Vigneron was named coadjutor bishop of the Diocese of Oakland on January 10, 2003.  He automatically succeeded Bishop John Cummins as the third bishop of Oakland on October 1, 2003.

While bishop Vigneron helped lead protests against same-sex marriage. At that time, he compared abortion and stem-cell research to slavery and racism.

Archbishop of Detroit
Pope Benedict XVI appointed Vigneron as archbishop of the Archdiocese of Detroit on January 5, 2009, replacing Cardinal Maida. Installed on January 28, 2009, Vigneron was the first Detroit native named archbishop of Detroit.

Vigneron was elected chair of the board of trustees of Catholic University of America on June 9, 2009. He received the pallium from Benedict XVI on June 29, 2009, in a ceremony at St. Peter's Basilica in Rome.  On April 21, 2011, Vigneron participated in an interfaith vigil held at the Islamic Center of America in Dearborn, Michigan.

On May 15, 2019, Vigneron published the pastoral note "The Day of the Lord", ending the practice of Catholic grade and high schools holding required sports practices and games on Sundays, in an effort to refocus that day on prayer, family and rest. 

On November 12, 2019, Vigneron was elected vice president of the United States Conference of Catholic Bishops (USCCB). At the end of the November 2020 USCCB meeting, Bishop José Gómez, USCCB president, created a bishops' working group headed by Vigernon to formulate a plan for dealing with  newly elected President Joe Biden.  According to the Washington Post, the group's work led to an unsuccessful effort by conservative bishops to approve a document at the June 2021 USCCB meeting to penalized Catholic politicians who support abortion rights for women.

On December 14, 2020, a lawsuit accused Vigernon of failing to investigate complaints of sexual abuse at Orchard Lake Schools, an educational center in the archdiocese.  Several male employees had accused Miroslaw Krol. a priest who was chancellor of the facility, of making sexual advances on them.  A school board member, who ultimately resigned, tried to bring the allegations to Vigneron, also a member of the board.  However, Vigneron refused to listen to the allegations because he said they were second-hand. Ned McGrath, the archdiocese spokesman, said the archdiocese did not run the facility and that Krol was under the jurisdiction of the Archdiocese of Newark.  By February 2021, the group had finished its work, but there was uncertainty about its final report.

On March 15, 2021, a Michigan man filed a sexual abuse lawsuit against Vigneron and the archdiocese.  The plaintiff claimed to have been raped in 2010 when he was eight years old by Aloysius Volskis, then a teacher at Bishop Kelly Catholic School in Lapeer, Michigan.  Volskis allegedly told the boy that he had power with the devil and would kill his  mother if he revealed anything.  After a female student reported an assault by Volskis to police, he fled the country.  The suit claimed that Vigneron and the archdiocese were negligent in their oversight of the school.  Volkis had been assigned to Bishop Kelly after he was accused of sexual misconduct at Divine Providence Parish in Southfield, Michigan.

Viewpoints

LGBT rights 
In 2013, Vigneron stated that Catholics who supported same sex-marriage should feel shameful about accepting communion in mass.  However, in 2015, he stated that the church does not want to drive any Catholics away from receiving communion, but only that, as per Catholic doctrine, any Catholic conscious of serious sin (such as supporting same-sex unions) should not receive holy communion without prior sacramental confession.

Immigration 
In December 2015, U.S. presidential candidate Donald Trump said that, if elected, he would restrict Muslim immigration into the United States.  In response, Vigneron wrote a letter to priests in the archdiocese condemning the Trump proposals:While the Catholic Church refrains from weighing in for or against individual candidates for a particular political office, the Church does and should speak to the morality of this important and far-reaching issue of religious liberty. Especially as our political discourse addresses the very real concerns about the security of our country, our families, and our values, we need to remember that religious rights are a cornerstone of these values. Restricting or sacrificing these religious rights and liberties out of fear – instead of defending them and protecting them in the name of mutual respect and justice – is a rationalization which fractures the very foundation of morality on which we stand. "

See also

 Catholic Church hierarchy
 Catholic Church in the United States
 Historical list of the Catholic bishops of the United States
 List of Catholic bishops of the United States
 Lists of patriarchs, archbishops, and bishops

References

External links
Roman Catholic Archdiocese of Detroit Official Site

 

1948 births
Sacred Heart Major Seminary alumni
Catholic University of America alumni
Living people
People from Mount Clemens, Michigan
21st-century Roman Catholic archbishops in the United States
Roman Catholic Diocese of Oakland
Roman Catholic archbishops of Detroit
Pontifical Gregorian University alumni
American people of French descent
American people of German descent
Sacred Heart Major Seminary faculty
Catholics from Michigan